Vasantrao Banduji "Vasantdada" Patil (13 November 1917 – 1 March 1989) was an Indian politician from Sangli, Maharashtra. He was known as the first modern Maratha strongman and first mass leader in Maharashtrian politics.

Patil served as Chief Minister of Maharashtra from 17 May 1977 to 18 July 1978 and again from 2 February 1983 to 1 June 1985. He also served as the Governor of Rajasthan for a little under two years from 1985 to 1987.

Personal life
Born on 13 November 1917 at 'Padmale'  from Sangli, his native village. He studied up to the vernacular final. Then he became a farmer. His first wife, Malati-tai Patil died in 1960s. Soon later, he married Shalinitai Patil (then Shalini Jadhav before her second marriage) who was a widow herself with four children from her first marriage. She herself was a minister in Maharashtra in 1980s. Vasantdada did not have any children from his second marriage. His son from the first marriage with Malti-tai Patil, named Prakash Patil, represented Sangli in Lok Sabha. After Prakash Patil's death in 2005, his son (and Vasantdada's grandson) Pratik Patil became MP from Sangli twice.

Freedom fighter
He was one of the young campaigners of Dhulappa Bhaurao Navale's election of local board in 1937. In 1940 Navale suggested Vasantdada's name for Tasgaon Taluka Congress secretary.  Vasantdada took part in the independence movement. In 1942, Mahatma Gandhi started the Satyagraha movement. He became a satyagrahi, following Vinoba Bhave, Navale, Vasantdada and V.S.Paage. For this he was jailed by the British government. In jail, he came under the influence of Babasaheb Kher, Sardar Patel and others.

He was influenced by Netaji Subhashchandra Bose, and believed that neither satyagraha, morchas nor people's movements alone would get freedom. Instead he looted railways and merchants (to provide the money to keep the struggle alive), and got guns and revolvers from Goa. Many criminal cases were filed against him. The British government offered a bounty of Rs.1000 for him. He was badly injured while trying to escape from jail. He was sentenced to imprisonment for 13 years.

Political career
On 25 April 1946 he was released and was welcomed by Sangli people. After Independence he started working on farmers' problems. He established a Market Committee in 1951, with the intention of giving proper prices to agriculture products. In the first meeting Br. G. D. Patil was elected as chief promoter.

He made efforts to increase irrigation in Sangli. In 1960 he became the chief promoter of the Groundnut Processors Co-operative Society.

He served as Chairman of Latthe Education Society. He started Miraj Medical College, Civil hospital, Akashwani (All India Radio station) at Sangli.

While active in politics from 1937, he first served as a Minister from 1972 until 1976 under Chief Minister Vasantrao Naik. In 1976 he was dropped from the Cabinet. He later served as Chief Minister of Maharashtra three times between 1976 and 1985.

He was elected as a member of 7th Lok Sabha from Sangli (Lok Sabha constituency) in 1980.

Education

Vasantdada Patil made great contributions to education.  Before 1983, few engineering and technical colleges served Maharashtra.  Hence, most students were going to other states for studies. Patil sponsored a bill to create private engineering and technical colleges in Maharashtra. Maharashtra became a centre for engineering and technical education.
He established Padmabhushan Vasantdada Patil Institute of Technology at Budhgaon, near Sangli on Sangli Tasgaon Road in Maharashtra.

Political and family connections
In 1985 he was embroiled in a public dispute with a Deputy Commissioner of BMC, G R Khairnar, for having demolished Patel's son's hotel "Step In". Khairnar eventually became a hero for taking on politicians, including Sharad Pawar. This dispute, meanwhile, discredited Congress rule and combined with other issues, gave the Shiv Sena-BJP combination an upper hand in subsequent elections.
 
His elder son Prakashbapu Vasantdada Patil and his grandson Pratik Prakashbapu Patil are former MPs from Sangli.

Vasantadada had a vast circle, but few close friends. Among these were  Navale, Page, Charudatta (Charubhai) Shah, P Pandurang Kadam (Tatya), Sampatrao Mane and Vittal Patil.

His second wife, Shalinitai Patil, is an MLA from Koregaon, Satara district. She joined the Nationalist Congress Party (NCP) in 1999, but was expelled for her opposition to reservation of 27.5% for Other Backward Classes (OBCs) in academic institutes such as Indian Institutes of Technology (IIT) and Indian Institutes of Management (IIM). However, she later declared that Marathas were too big a community for any political party to displease, and said "... the economically backward classes across all communities should be given reservation. At least 50 per cent of Maharashtra's population needs quotas."

Vasantdada Patil died on 1 March 1989.

Recognition

 Padma Bhushan award (1967).
 Padmabhushan Vasantdada Patil Pratishthan's College of Engineering in Mumbai is named in his honour.

See also

Sharad Pawar
Sundarrao Solanke
Vilasrao Deshmukh

References

External links

1917 births
1989 deaths
People from Sangli
Governors of Rajasthan
Chief Ministers of Maharashtra
Marathi politicians
Indian National Congress politicians
Lok Sabha members from Maharashtra
India MPs 1980–1984
Maharashtra MLAs 1972–1978
Maharashtra MLAs 1978–1980
Maharashtra MLAs 1980–1985
Chief ministers from Indian National Congress
Indian National Congress (U) politicians